Bagrat was a Georgian royal prince (batonishvili) of the Bagrationi dynasty.

Son of King Constantine I of Georgia.

Bagrat whose revolt against his reigning brother Alexander I of Georgia is recorded in the 18th-century continuation of the Georgian chronicles, but unattested elsewhere. According to the 20th-century historian Cyril Toumanoff, Bagrat had a daughter Tamar, also known as Nestan-Darejan, who married, in 1445, her cousin, George, co-king of Kakheti and subsequently king of Georgia (as George VIII) and then of Kakheti (as George I). She is last mentioned in 1510.

References

Bagrationi dynasty of the Kingdom of Georgia
Georgian princes
15th-century people from Georgia (country)
14th-century people from Georgia (country)